Taupo International Motorsport Park and Events Centre (previously known as the Bruce McLaren Motorsport Park) is a motorsports circuit located in Broadlands Road, Taupo, New Zealand. It is owned by Tony Quinn who also owns Highlands Motorsport Park and Hampton Downs Motorsport Park.

The circuit was an upgrade from a  Taupo Car Club's circuit to the new  international layout in 2006. The Motorsport Park was completed in 2006 at the cost of NZ$13 million. It features driver training facilities, a motorsport business park with 13 first floor corporate suites and a second floor race control, corporate and catering complex.

History
On 21 January 2007 Taupo Motorsport Park hosted the sixth race in the 2006–07 A1 Grand Prix season and on 20 January 2008 it hosted the fifth race in the 2007–08 A1 Grand Prix season. In order to create more overtaking opportunities, a tighter chicane was introduced at the end of the straight. On 25 January 2009 Taupo Motorsport Park hosted the fourth race in the 2008–09 A1 Grand Prix season. Owing to the tight 'S' bend close to the start causing collisions in the past, the rolling start was replaced by a standing start for the 2009 event's Sprint race.

The Taupo Race Track project has received a Silver Award by the Association of Consulting Engineers New Zealand, praising the high-quality delivery of the project, which was designed and constructed in tandem to achieve very tight deadlines. However, on 8 May 2008 Newstalk ZB reported that the motorsport park was NZ$3 million in debt and the owners were seeking equity to help keep their business afloat. 

The circuit was renamed Bruce McLaren Motorsport Park on 26 November 2015, as a tribute to former Formula One driver and team owner Bruce McLaren. The renaming occurred as Taupo directors announced they would be rebuilding the circuit to maintain its FIA Grade 2 status. However, the circuit is renamed Taupo International Motorsport Park, after Tony Quinn purchased the circuit in November 2021.

The circuit
The motor racing circuit has various licences ranging from National Grade 1 Motorsport Licence, FIA Grade 2 Motorsport Licence and International Motorcycling Safety Standards depending on which track configuration. A1 Team Ireland's driver Adam Carroll commented that the track has few bumps and is technical and tight.

Lap Records

The unofficial all-time track record is 1:14.072, set by Nico Hülkenberg on the qualifying of 2006–07 A1 Grand Prix of Nations, New Zealand. The official race lap records at the Taupo International Motorsport Park are listed as:

Notes

References

External links
 
 Circuit info

Motorsport venues in New Zealand
A1 Grand Prix circuits
Sport in Taupō
Drag racing venues in Australasia
Sports venues in Waikato
2006 establishments in New Zealand
Sports venues completed in 2006